zoocentrism may refer to:
 The claim that at least some animals have moral standing, similar to Biocentrism (ethics)